Trout Pond — formerly called Old Pond — located near Wardensville in Hardy County, West Virginia, USA, is the state's only natural lake. The small "lake" is situated in the Trout Pond Recreation Area (TPRA)  of the George Washington National Forest. Formerly, the pond had fluctuated in surface area between 2 and 3 acres, but recently it has appeared to be disappearing due to underground structural changes.

History
Trout Pond was created by a sinkhole that filled with water from a series of mountain streams running off Long Mountain. Much of the region surrounding Trout Pond lies on layers of limestone that have been slowly eroded away by rainfall, causing conical holes to open up within the ground. Many of these sinkholes grow quite large with significant depths like Trout Pond, but because of its unique location, it had, until recently, been able to maintain a permanent status as a pond. In July 2002, Forest Service officials suspected that a shift in the limestone cavern underneath the sinkhole had caused the water level to drop. Within a month, it had drained almost dry. It has regenerated several times since then, during long spells of wet weather, but as soon as the rains stop it empties again.

Geology
Trout Pond and its sinkhole are karst features. They are underlain by strata of Tonoloway Limestone and the Helderberg Formation.

TPRA
The facilities of the Trout Pond Recreation Area were constructed in the late 1970s. This National Forest campground has a designated swimming area, easy lakeside trails, a children's playground and 50 campsites. The normal operating season is early May through the last Monday in October.

Trout Pond has long been stocked with trout, hence its current name. This was discontinued for a time, however, due to erosion of the banks caused by fishermen.

See also 
 List of sinkholes of the United States

References

External links
WVDNR webpage for Trout Pond

Sinkholes of the United States
Bodies of water of Hardy County, West Virginia
Lakes of West Virginia
Potomac River watershed
Chesapeake Bay watershed